Bülent Çetinaslan (born 25 May 1974) is a Turkish actor and former model. He is mostly recognized for his performances in Duvar (2007) as Taylan and subsequently Arka Sıradakiler (2007–2012) as Oktay Karaca.

Career 
He graduated his primary and high school in Ankara. He never attended university but instead worked as a professional volleyball player for various teams. He began his acting career with Ayla Algan. After that he carried on his education in Kenter Theatre.

Filmography

References

External links 
 Bülent Çetinaslan at Sinematurk
 

1974 births
Living people
Turkish male television actors
Turkish male film actors
People from Ankara